Mastixia tetrandra is a species of plant in the Nyssaceae family. It is endemic to Sri Lanka where it is known as දියතලිය (diyathaliya) by local people.

References

Endemic flora of Sri Lanka
tetrandra
Vulnerable plants
Taxonomy articles created by Polbot